Sing the Greys is the debut studio album by Scottish indie rock band Frightened Rabbit, originally released in May 2006 on Hits the Fan Records, with a limited run of 1000 copies. A remixed/remastered version was released in the United States by FatCat Records on 2 October 2007 and in the UK on 17 November 2007.

In an interview concerning the record's re-release in 2007, vocalist/guitarist Scott Hutchison states that: "little bits and pieces [were] re-recorded. We've re-amped some of the drums in different rooms to get an ambience about it. It's louder and everything is fuller and bigger."

In the same interview, drummer Grant Hutchison states that: "Fat Cat were just going to release it on a low scale as a taster for the new album. But when we remixed and mastered it, it sounded like a proper album and we felt those songs were too good to just brush under carpet."

Scott Hutchison states that, by the end of 2007, the band was "pretty sick of Sing the Greys. We were saying goodbye to that record and just really itching for people to hear the new one."

The artwork for the album is by vocalist/guitarist Scott Hutchison.

The album entered the Scottish Albums Chart for the first time in 2018, following Hutchison's death.

Track listing

Bonus track on remastered version

Personnel
 Scott Hutchison – lead vocals, rhythm guitar
 Grant Hutchison – drums, percussion, backing vocals
 Billy Kennedy – guitar, bass guitar, keyboards, backing vocals

Technical personnel
 Marcus Mackay – production, mixing
 Alan Douches – mastering

Other credits
 Scott Hutchison – artwork
 D. Thomas – layout design
 Catherine C. Williamson – layout design

Charts

References

2006 debut albums
Frightened Rabbit albums
FatCat Records albums